Schweizerischer Verband für Frauenstimmrecht (SVF), was a women's organization in Switzerland, founded in 1909.  
It was one of the two main women's suffrage organisations in Switzerland, alongside the Bund Schweizerischer Frauenvereine (BSF).

Chairperson

 1909-1912: Auguste de Morsier
 1912-1914: Louise von Arx-Lack
 1914-1928: Emilie Gourd
 1928-1940	Annie Leuch-Reineck
 1940-1952	Elisabeth Vischer-Alioth
 1952-1959	Alix Choisy-Necker
 1959-1960: Gertrud Heinzelmann
 1960-1968	Lotti Ruckstuhl
 1968-1977	Gertrude Girard-Montet

References 

Women's suffrage in Switzerland
Feminist organisations in Switzerland
1909 establishments
Political organisations based in Switzerland
Organizations established in 1909
Voter rights and suffrage organizations
1909 in women's history